Víctor Amaury Núñez Rodríguez (born 15 April 1980) is a  retired professional footballer who played as a forward for multiple clubs, including C.S. Herediano, L.D. Alajuelense, and Deportivo Saprissa. He currently serves as assistant coach at C.S. Herediano.

He has the all-time record for the number of goals in Costa Rica's first division.

Born in the Dominican Republic, Núñez moved to Costa Rica at age 9. He was naturalised there on 31 January 2003, and subsequently opted to play internationally for the Costa Rica national team.

Club career
Nuñez came out of the minor league system of Deportivo Saprissa where he played his first seasons. He made his professional debut in a league match against Goicoechea on 16 December 1999.

Nuñez scored his first goal on 12 October 2000 against Alajuelense while playing on loan for Limonense. He has led the league in goal-scoring four times (Invierno 2007, Invierno 2008, Invierno 2009 and Verano 2013) and became the top active league goalscorer in March 2009 while becoming the second player to score more than 200 league goals in November 2013. He simultaneously amassed a total of 217 goals in all games, only 30 short of Costa Rican recordholder Juan Ulloa.

His nickname, El Mambo, references the traditional rhythm of his home country (mambo).

He never fully earned trust at Saprissa so he was loaned again once he went back to them. After a few bad disappointing seasons with Saprissa but with a high recognition in the country, he was signed by Saprissa's archrival Alajuelense. He did not have a lot of options during his first year, so he was, again, loaned to Cartaginés and after an amazing campaign he returned to Alajuelense and finally became an important piece of the team. In July 2010, he joined Herediano from Águilas Guanacastecas. After four years with Herediano, Núñez moved abroad to play for Honduran side Real España.

He is a strong and decisive player who has a great ability to dribble rivals and has score amazing goals, he is usually very accurate on his shots.

On 23 June 2018, he was signed by Cibao FC in his natal country, Dominican Republic, where he will not occupy a place of foreigners.

International career
Núñez made his debut for Costa Rica in a February 2006 friendly match against South Korea and has, as of May 2014, earned a total of 28 caps, scoring 6 goals. He represented his country in 7 FIFA World Cup qualification matches and was part of the Costa Rica squad for 2006 FIFA World Cup held in Germany, making him the first Dominican Republic-born athlete to compete in a FIFA World Cup..

He also played at the 2009 UNCAF Nations Cup and 2011 Copa Centroamericana

Career statistics

International goals
Scores and results list. Costa Rica's goal tally first.

References

External links
 
 Profile - Nación 
 Goal records  

1980 births
Living people
Sportspeople from Santo Domingo
Dominican Republic emigrants to Costa Rica
Naturalized citizens of Costa Rica
Association football forwards
Dominican Republic footballers
Costa Rican footballers
Costa Rica international footballers
2006 FIFA World Cup players
2009 UNCAF Nations Cup players
2011 Copa Centroamericana players
Liga FPD players
Deportivo Saprissa players
L.D. Alajuelense footballers
C.S. Cartaginés players
Municipal Liberia footballers
C.S. Herediano footballers
Real C.D. España players
Liga Dominicana de Fútbol players
Cibao FC players
Dominican Republic expatriate footballers
Expatriate footballers in Honduras
Costa Rican people of Dominican Republic descent